Pietro Riario (1445 – 3 January 1474) was an Italian cardinal and Papal diplomat.

Biography
Born in Savona, he was the son of Paolo Riario and Pope Sixtus IVs' sister, Bianca Della Rovere. Sixtus nominated him in 1471 bishop of Treviso and cardinal, and, in 1473, archbishop of Florence. He was entrusted with Sixtus' foreign policy. To reinforce the alliance between Rome and Milan, he had his brother Girolamo married to the daughter of Galeazzo Maria Sforza, Duke of Milan.

He was a humanist known for his patronage of literature and the arts, his huge feasts, luxurious behaviour and irreligious conduct. He had a large palace begun in Rome, near the church of Santi Apostoli (it was completed by his cousin Giuliano della Rovere, pope as Julius II). In 1473 he had the square before his palazzo transformed with painted canvas and wooden construction into temporary but luxurious lodging for the daughter of the King of Naples, who was entertained in June with an extravagant banquet with forty piatti that included roast stags, herons, the requisite roast peacock, even a roast bear. The bread was gilded.

In 1473 he travelled to northern Italy to oversee the cession of Imola from Milan to the Republic of Florence. At his return to Rome, Riario died suddenly in his house at age 28. It was suspected that he had been poisoned, although an indigestion was more likely. He was buried in Santi Apostoli in a magnificent Renaissance tomb sculpted by Mino da Fiesole and Andrea Bregno. His role as Sixtus' collaborator was inherited by his cousin Giuliano della Rovere.

Notes 

1445 births
1474 deaths
People from Savona
15th-century Italian cardinals
Roman Catholic archbishops of Florence
Bishops of Treviso
Italian patrons of the arts
Cardinal-nephews
15th-century Italian Roman Catholic archbishops
Medieval Italian diplomats
Latin Patriarchs of Constantinople
15th-century diplomats
15th-century Roman Catholic archbishops in the Republic of Florence